7th arrondissement may refer to:
 7th arrondissement of Lyon
 7th arrondissement of Marseille
 7th arrondissement of Paris
7th arrondissement of the Littoral Department, Benin

Arrondissement name disambiguation pages